The Rolls-Royce 102EX, also known as the Phantom Experimental Electric (EE), is a one-off electric prototype version of the Rolls-Royce Phantom VII. It was created by Rolls-Royce to gauge the response of customers and other stakeholders to an electric Rolls-Royce. The 102EX was unveiled at the 2011 Geneva Motor Show.

Specifications 
The 102EX is powered by two UQM-supplied synchronous permanent-magnet electric motors mounted on the rear sub-frame. Power is transmitted to the rear wheels by a 1-speed Xtrac transmission with integrated differential.

These motors are fed by a 71 kWh battery pack which is composed of 96 NCM cells. These cells are placed in the space occupied by a standard Phantom's engine and gearbox. Peak battery current is 850 amperes delivered at 338 volts (DC). The cells were manufactured by Dow Kokam, which Scottish firm Axeon assembled into a battery pack. Electric drivetrain integration was carried out by Lotus Engineering.

The battery pack is charged by 3 separate 3 kW charger units which allow for a minimum charging time of approximately 8 hours. Alternatively, the Phantom is also fitted with an induction charger which allows the car to be charged wirelessly.

The 102EX is differentiated from series production Phantoms visually. It is painted in "Atlantic Chrome" silver which uses ceramic nano-particles to increase the reflectivity of the paint. It is fitted with red "double-R" badges, which Rolls-Royce uses to denote its experimental vehicles. The Spirit of Ecstasy is made of Makrolon polycarbonate and is illuminated by blue LED light. The fuel filler cap features a glass window, allowing one to see the five-pin socket used to charge the 102EX. The interior and luggage compartment use "Corinova" leather. This is a type of leather that is vegetable tanned, as opposed to chrome tanned like ordinary Phantom leather.

Reception 
The Phantom was well-received by automotive journalists. Reviewers praised the exceptional refinement afforded by the 102EX's quiet powertrain, while some also felt that ride quality had been improved over the standard Phantom.

Rolls-Royce revealed in 2012 that customer reaction to the 102EX had been lukewarm. While the 102EX's refinement had been praised, customers took issue with the car's limited range and long charging times. Some also felt that the absence of a V12 detracted from the car's specialness.

See also
 Battery electric vehicle
 Plug-in electric vehicle

Notes

References

External links
 Electric Cars, Rolls-Royce website
 "Driving the electric Rolls-Royce", BBC News, 1 April 2011
 102EX – Phantom Experimental Electric Press Kit (Rolls-Royce press release), 1 March 2011

102EX
Concept cars